Christina Pinnow (born 8 July 1967) is a German sailor. She competed in the women's 470 event at the 1992 Summer Olympics.

References

External links
 

1967 births
Living people
German female sailors (sport)
Olympic sailors of Germany
Sailors at the 1992 Summer Olympics – 470
Sportspeople from Potsdam